Whangaparāoa is an electorate in the New Zealand House of Representatives. It was first created for the 2020 New Zealand general election and is represented by Mark Mitchell of the National Party; Mitchell had previously been the representative for the now abolished Rodney electorate.

Population centres
The electorate is located on the northern fringe of the Auckland metropolitan area, in the former Rodney District. It is centred on the Whangaparaoa Peninsula, and more broadly the Hibiscus Coast. It also extends south to include Dairy Flat, Coatesville, Paremoremo and some of the suburb of Albany, reaching the northern coast of the Waitematā Harbour.

History
Whangaparāoa was created in the 2019/20 electoral redistribution. Rapid population growth in the area necessitated the splitting of the former  electorate, with the northern section around Warkworth being incorporated into the new Kaipara ki Mahurangi electorate, and the rest of the electorate becoming Whangaparāoa.

The electorate is reasonably safe for National, with the final MP for Rodney Mark Mitchell transferring to the seat upon its creation.

Members of Parliament

As of  no candidates who have contested the Whangaparāoa electorate have been returned as list MPs.

Election results

2020 election

References

2020 establishments in New Zealand
New Zealand electorates in the Auckland Region